Melanie Fullerton (born August 29, 1962) is an actress in the late 1960s and early 1970s. She co-starred in Night of the Lepus (1972) with Stuart Whitman and in To Rome With Love (1969-1971) with John Forsythe, Vito Scotti, Joyce Menges, and Susan Neher.

Fullerton was born in Kansas City, Missouri.

Filmography

References

External links

1962 births
Living people
American film actresses
American child actresses
20th-century American actresses
Actresses from Kansas City, Missouri
American television actresses